Sorcery is an album by Jack DeJohnette featuring Bennie Maupin, John Abercrombie, Mick Goodrick, Dave Holland and Michael Fellerman recorded in 1974 and released on the Prestige label. The Allmusic review by Scott Yanow states, "A lot of rambling takes place on this interesting but erratic CD reissue... While one admires DeJohnette's willingness to take chances, this music has not dated well".

Track listing 
All compositions by Jack DeJohnette except as indicated
 "Sorcery, No. 1" - 13:50  
 "The Right Time" - 2:21  
 "The Rock Thing" - 4:14 
 "The Reverend King Suite: Reverend King/Obstructions/The Fatal Shot/Mourning/Unrest/New Spirits on the Horizon" (John Coltrane/DeJohnette) - 14:19  
 "Four Levels of Joy" - 3:09  
 "Epilog" (DeJohnette, Dave Holland) - 3:11  
Recorded at Willow, NY in March 1974 and at Bearsville Studios, NY in May 1974

Personnel
Jack DeJohnette: drums, keyboards, C-melody saxophone
Bennie Maupin: bass clarinet
John Abercrombie, Mick Goodrick: guitars
Dave Holland: bass
Michael Fellerman: metaphone 1, trombone

References

1974 albums
Jack DeJohnette albums
Jazz-funk albums
Prestige Records albums